Belgaum North Lok Sabha constituency was a Lok Sabha constituency in Bombay State.  This seat came into existence in 1951. With the implementation of States Reorganisation Act, 1956, it ceased to exist.

Assembly segments
Belgaum North Lok Sabha constituency comprised the following six Legislative Assembly segments:
Athani
Chikodi Raibagh
Athani Chikodi
Chikodi (2 Seats)
Hukeri
Konnur

After Belgaum district of erstwhile Bombay State got merged with Mysore State in 1956, this seat ceased to exist and was replaced by Chikkodi Lok Sabha constituency.

Members of Parliament 
1952: Balavantrao Nagesharao Datar, Indian National Congress
1957 onwards: Constituency does not exist. See a) Chikkodi Lok Sabha constituency, and b) Belgaum Lok Sabha constituency

Notes

See also
 Belgaum South Lok Sabha constituency
 Chikkodi Lok Sabha constituency
 Belgaum Lok Sabha constituency
 Belgaum district
 List of former constituencies of the Lok Sabha

Belagavi district
Former constituencies of the Lok Sabha
Constituencies disestablished in 1956
Politics of Mumbai
1956 disestablishments in India
Former Lok Sabha constituencies of Karnataka
Lok Sabha constituencies in Mumbai